Karllangia is a genus of marine copepods. Its name commemorates the Swedish carcinologist Karl Georg Herman Lang. The genus contains five species:
Karllangia arenicola Noodt, 1964
Karllangia obscura Mielke, 1994
Karllangia ornatissima (Monard, 1935)
Karllangia psammophila Wells, 1967
Karllangia pulchra Mielke, 1994

References

Harpacticoida